Jesus Blesses or Christ Blessing (in Manado language is Yesus Kase Berkat or Kristus Kase Berkat) is a statue of Jesus Christ in Manado, North Sulawesi, Indonesia. The structure stands 50 metres (158.3 feet) tall and consists of 20 metres of pedestal and 30 metres of statue. It is made of 25 tonnes of metal fibre and 35 tonnes of steel, and is located at the peak of the CitraLand residential estate. As of 2010 it is Asia's 2nd tallest and the world's 4th tallest statue of Christ (excluding the pedestal it was erected on).

History
The idea came from Ir. Ciputra, an Indonesian real estate developer, when he and his wife stood on the place where the statue is now. The statue was built for Manado and North Sulawesi society and to worship God. The construction took nearly three years by the Yogyakarta Engineer. The cost of the monument was five billion rupiah (about 540,000 dollars).

This statue has a declivity 20 degree and is made from fiber and steel and became the "first flying tallest statue in the world."

See also
 List of statues of Jesus
 List of tallest statues

References

Buildings and structures in North Sulawesi
Colossal statues of Jesus
Monuments and memorials in Indonesia
Christianity in Indonesia